Charles Grant (died 1979) was a Scottish game author who helped popularize the hobby of tabletop wargaming. He is best known as the author of The War Game.

Grant was born in Scotland, and served in the Royal Air Force in World War II. Later in Scotland Yard's Special Branch. Contributor to Military Modelling and Battle. Sometime editor of Slingshot the Journal of the Society of Ancients.

He has had influence among the designers of Warhammer Ancient Battles. Jeff Jonas describes his writings as inspirational.

Grant died in May 1979. He is survived by his son Charles S. Grant, who is also a published wargamer, and his daughter Nina.

Notes

Books 
 Ancient Battles for Wargamers, Charles Grant, Model and Allied Publications, 1977. 
 Battle of Fontenoy (Background books for wargamers and modellers) 1975
 Battle: Practical Wargaming, Charles Grant, Model and Allied Publications, 1970.
 Napoleonic Wargaming, Charles Grant, Model and Allied Publications, 1974. (To be re-published by Caliver Books, Summer 2008)
 The Ancient War Game, Charles Grant, A. & C. Black, 1974, .
 The War Game, Charles Grant, A. & C. Black, 1971, (Back in print as in May 2008)
 Wargame Tactics, Charles Grant, Cassell, 1979. 

Board game designers
Miniature wargames
1979 deaths
Year of birth missing